Sutilizonidae is a taxonomic family of sea snails, deepwater hydrothermal vent snails, marine gastropod mollusks in the clade Vetigastropoda (according to the taxonomy of the Gastropoda by Bouchet & Rocroi, 2005).

Taxonomy 
This family has no subfamilies.

Temnocinclinae McLean, 1989 was considered to be a synonym of Sutilizonidae by Bouchet & Rocroi (2005), but was updated to family level as Temnocinclidae by Geiger in 2009.

Genera 
Genera within the family Sutilizonidae include:
 Sutilizona McLean, 1989
 Temnocinclis McLean, 1989
 Temnozaga McLean, 1989

References